Tongatapu 1 is an electoral constituency for the Legislative Assembly in the Kingdom of Tonga. It was established for the November 2010 general election, when the multi-seat regional constituencies for People's Representatives were replaced by single-seat constituencies, electing one representative via the first past the post electoral system. Located on the country's main island, Tongatapu, it encompasses the villages of Kolomotuʻa, Tongataʻeapa, Tufuenga, Sopu-ʻo-Taufaʻahau, ʻIsileli, Halaʻo vave, Tuʻatakilangi, Longolongo, Vaololoa, and Kapeta.

Its first ever representative was ʻAkilisi Pohiva, a veteran MP first elected in 1987 and who thus began his ninth consecutive term; the leading figure of the pro-democracy movement, he was the leader of the Democratic Party of the Friendly Islands. He won the seat by an overwhelming margin, appearing to make it, at present, a safe seat for the party. In the 2014 general election he was re-elected comfortably, with a diminished but still absolute majority (53.5%).

Members of Parliament

Election results

2014

2010

References

Tongan legislative constituencies
Tongatapu
2010 establishments in Tonga
Constituencies established in 2010